The Gaudiya Math is a Gaudiya Vaishnava matha (monastic organisation) formed on 6 September 1920, about 30 months after Bhaktisiddhanta Sarasvati took sannyasa, the renounced order of life. On 7 March 1918, the same day he took sannyasa, he established the Sri Chaitanya Math in Mayapura in West Bengal, later recognised as the parent body of all the Gaudiya Math branches. Its purpose was to spread Gaudiya Vaishnavism, the philosophy of the medieval Vaisnava saint Chaitanya Mahaprabhu, through preaching and publishing.

From the beginning of Chaitanya's bhakti movement in Bengal, devotees, including Haridasa Thakur and others, whether Muslim or Hindu by birth, have been participants. This openness and disregard for the traditional caste system received a boost from the "broad-minded vision" of Bhaktivinoda Thakura, a nineteenth-century magistrate and prolific writer on bhakti topics, and was institutionalised by his son and successor Bhaktisiddhanta Sarasvati Thakura in the twentieth-century Gaudiya Math.

Branches

The Gaudiya Math had established 64 branches. Most were in India, but preaching centres were maintained for a time in British Burma, England and Germany. The first European preaching center was established in London in 1933 (London Glouster House, Cornwall Garden, W7 South Kensington) under the name Gaudiya Mission Society of London'. Lord Zetland, the English Secretary of State, was the president of this society.
The second European preaching center was opened by Swami B.H. Bon Maharaj in Berlin (W30 Eisenacherstr. 29).

History
Soon after the Srila Bhaktisiddhanta Saraswati's death (1 January 1937), a dispute began and the original Gaudiya Math mission divided by the court in 1948 into two administrative bodies which continued preaching on their own, up to the present day. In a settlement they divided the 64 Gaudiya Math centers into two groups. Sri Chaitanya Math Branch were headed by Srila Bhakti Vilasa Tirtha Maharaj. Gaudiya Mission were headed by Ananta Vasudev Prabhu, who became known as Srila Bhakti Prasad Puri Maharaj after accepting sannyasa for short duration.

Many of the disciples of Bhaktisiddhanta Sarasvati did not agree with the spirit of these newly created two fractions, or were simply inspired to expand the mission of their guru on their own enthusiasm, started their own missions. Many of these autonomous missions are still known as Gaudiya Math. Some of the other notable new missions are:

 Sri Gaudiya Vedanta Samiti established by Bhakti Prajnan Keshava Maharaj and Bhakti Rakshak Sridhar Goswami Maharaj (1940)
 Sri Chaitanya Saraswat Math established by Bhakti Rakshak Sridhar Maharaj (1941)
  established by Srila Bhakti Dayita Madhav Goswami Maharaj (1953)
 International Society for Krishna Consciousness established by A. C. Bhaktivedanta Swami Prabhupada (1966)
  established by Srila Bhakti Vaibhava Puri Goswami Maharaj (1966)
 Science of Identity Foundation established by Siddhaswarupananda Paramahamsa (1977)
 Sri Sri Radha Govindaji Trust established by Srila Bhakti Hridaya Bon (1979)
 Sri Caitanya Sangha, a.k.a. Gaudiya Vaishnavite Society, established by Tripurari Swami (1985)
  established by Srila Bhakti Pramode Puri Goswami Maharaj (1989)
 
Some are very large missions, and some are smaller branches started by individual Vaishnavas. What they hold in common is that they are autonomous branches of the tree of the Gaudiya Math. Almost all of them have published books and periodicals and opened one or more temples. There is little cooperation among these missions. Nevertheless, in 1994 many of them formed united the World Vaisnava Association — Visva Vaisnava Raj Sabha (WVA–VVRS).

References and notes

  
 

Gaudiya Vaishnavism
Hindu organizations
Hindu religious orders
Hindu monasteries in India
Hindu new religious movements
Hindu organisations based in India
Hinduism in Kolkata
Nadia district
Organisations based in Kolkata
Religious organizations established in 1920
1920 establishments in British India